Shop Girl may refer to:
 Shopgirl, 2005 American romantic comedy drama film directed by Anand Tucker
 The Shop Girl, musical comedy in two acts written by H. J. W. Dam
 The Shop Girl (Tissot),  (La Demoiselle de Magasin) is a painting by James Tissot in the collection of the Art Gallery of Ontario